Kang Gi-yun (born 4 June 1960) is a South Korean politician who is member of the National Assembly. He was a member of the South Gyeongsang Provincial Council from 2002 to 2007.

Life 
Kang Gi-yun was born on 4 June 1960 in Changwon, South Gyeongsang Province. He served as CEO of a metal industry company and also worked as a civil servant in Changwon City Government and South Gyeongsang Provincial Government.

Later, he joined the Grand National Party and won the 2002 local elections as a member of the South Gyeongsang Provincial Council. He ran in the Changwon B in the 2008 legislative election, but was defeated by Kwon Young-ghil of the Democratic Labor Party. Then he ran again for the next election and won the election for the first time. He ran for re-election in the 2016 legislative election, but was defeated by Roh Hoe-chan of the Justice Party. In July 2018, the death of Roh Hoe-chan led to by-election in Seongsan District, Changwon, where he ran again.

References

External links 
 

1960 births
Living people
People from Changwon
People from South Gyeongsang Province
Members of the National Assembly (South Korea)
Liberty Korea Party politicians